The following Union Army units and commanders fought in the Siege of Vicksburg of the American Civil War. The Confederate order of battle is listed separately. Order of battle compiled from the army organization during the campaign.

Abbreviations used

Military rank
 MG = Major General
 BG = Brigadier General
 Col = Colonel
 Ltc = Lieutenant Colonel
 Maj = Major
 Cpt = Captain
 Lt = Lieutenant
 Sgt = Sergeant

Other
 w = wounded
 mw = mortally wounded
 k = killed

Army of the Tennessee

MG Ulysses S. Grant, Commanding

General Staff:
 Acting Inspector General: BG Jeremiah C. Sullivan
 Chief of Transportation: Col Joseph D. Webster
 Chief of Staff: Ltc John A. Rawlins

General Headquarters:
 Escort: 4th Illinois Cavalry, Company A: Cpt Embury D. Osband
 Engineers: 1st Battalion, Engineer Regiment of the West: Maj William Tweeddale
 Mississippi Marine Brigade: BG Alfred W. Ellet
 Mississippi Ram Fleet: Col Charles Rivers Ellet
 1st Battalion Infantry: Ltc George E. Currie
 1st Battalion Cavalry: Major James M. Hubbard
 Artillery Battery: Cpt Daniel Walling

IX Corps

MG John Parke

XIII Corps

MG John A. McClernand

MG Edward Ord

Escort
 3rd Illinois Cavalry, Company L: Cpt David R. Sparks
Pioneers
 Kentucky Engineers (Independent Company): Cpt William F. Patterson

XV Corps

MG William T. Sherman

Chief of Staff: Ltc John Henry Hammond
Chief of Artillery: Maj Ezra Taylor

XVI Corps (detachment)
MG Cadwallader C. Washburn

XVII Corps

MG James B. McPherson

Escort
 4th Company Ohio Cavalry: Cpt John S. Foster

District of Northeast Louisiana
BG Elias S. Dennis

Notes

References
U.S. War Department, The War of the Rebellion: a Compilation of the Official Records of the Union and Confederate Armies, U.S. Government Printing Office, 1880–1901.
U.S. War Department, The War of the Rebellion: a Compilation of the Official Records of the Union and Confederate Armies, U.S. Government Printing Office, 1880–1901:  General summary of Casualties in the Union forces against Vicksburg, May 1–July 4, 1863.
Civil War Home: Organization of the Union Army At Vicksburg May 19–July 4, 1863 -- The Siege of Vicksburg, Miss. 
National Park Service: Vicksburg National Military Park (Siege of Vicksburg: Union order of battle).
National Park Service: Vicksburg National Military Park (Troops in the Campaign, Siege and Defense of Vicksburg).
National Park Service: Vicksburg National Military Park (Campaign, Siege and Defense of Vicksburg -- General summary of Casualties, March 29–July 4).
 Hess, Earl J. "Storming Vicksburg: Grant, Pemberton, and the Battles of May 19-22, 1863." University of North Carolina Press (2020)

American Civil War orders of battle